Paul Cobb Methuen (15 June 1752 – 15 September 1816) was an English politician.

He was the eldest son of Paul Methuen of Corsham, Wilshire and Christian née Cobb and educated at University College, Oxford (1769).

He was Member of Parliament (MP) for Great Bedwyn from 1781 to 1784. He was appointed High Sheriff of Wiltshire for  1780–81.

He married Matilda, the daughter of Sir Thomas Gooch, 3rd Baronet of Benacre, Suffolk and had four sons, including Paul Methuen, later 1st Baron Methuen, and four daughters.

References

 

1752 births
1816 deaths
Members of the Parliament of Great Britain for English constituencies
British MPs 1780–1784
High Sheriffs of Wiltshire
Members of Parliament for Great Bedwyn
Paul Cobb